The 1907–08 West Virginia Mountaineers men's basketball team represents the University of West Virginia during the 1907–08 college men's basketball season. The team captain was Earle Percy. The teamwas led by James Jenkins coaching his first season with the Mountaineers.

Schedule

|-

References

West Virginia Mountaineers men's basketball seasons
West Virginia
West Virginia Mountaineers men's b
West Virginia Mountaineers men's b